Fox 5 is a television station call sign associated with the Fox Broadcasting Company.

Fox 5 may also refer to:

TV stations in the United States

Fox owned-and-operated
WAGA-TV, Atlanta, GA
WNYW, New York, NY
WTTG "Channel 5", Washington, D.C.

Fox-affiliated stations
KFBB-DT2, Great Falls, Montana
KFYR-DT2, Bismarck, North Dakota
KSWB-TV, San Diego, California (cable channel; broadcasts on channel 69)
KVVU-TV, Henderson (Las Vegas, Nevada)
KXPI-LD, Idaho Falls, Idaho (cable channel; broadcasts on channel 34)

Formerly Fox stations
KIVV-TV (now KHSD-TV), Lead / Rapid City, South Dakota (1996 to 2016)
KRBK, Springfield, Missouri (broadcasts on channel 49; branded as Fox 5 from 2014 to 2018)

Other uses
 FOX-5, the Distant Early Warning site at Qikiqtarjuaq, Nunavut, Canada (formerly Broughton Island)

See also
 Fox Television Stations
 Fox (international)